Brandi Angela Brandt (born November 2, 1968) is an American model and actress, who was Playboy's Playmate of the Month for October 1987.

Early life
Brandt was born on November 2, 1968, in Santa Clara, California to parents Mike Brandt and drummer, percussionist, and vocalist, Brie Howard-Darling (née Berry). Her parents divorced in 1972 and she split her time with her mother in Los Angeles, California and her father in Sacramento, California. When Brandt was 12 years old, she met comedic actor Jon Lovitz, who at the time was in a Groundlings class with American Girls bandmate Hillary Matthews. Brandt and Lovitz became friends.

Career

Playboy
At age 18, Brandt appeared as the Playmate of the Month and cover girl for the October 1987 Back To Campus issue of Playboy magazine. She also appeared in Playboy Blondes, Brunettes, Redheads magazine and on the cover with Debi Nicole Johnson and Sandra Wild.

She was the cover model for Playboy's August 1989 Women Of Wall Street issue and appeared on the cover of the March 1990 issue with Donald Trump. An autographed copy of Playboy with President Donald Trump and Brandt on the cover sold at auction for $4,900 by Goldin Auctions and has Trump's recognizable signature scrawled across its cover. The minimum bid was $100, and there were 33 bids on Lot #1338.

Acting and television appearances
Brandt appeared as herself in "Desperately Seeking Miss October", the November 5, 1989 episode of the television sitcom Married... with Children. In the episode, Brandt patronizes the store at which protagonist Al Bundy (Ed O'Neill) works, to purchase a pair of stiletto heels (... black, size 6), setting off a competition to please her between Al and his visiting friend Steve Rhoades (David Garrison), who recognize her from Playboy. When she asks how much the shoes are, a grateful Al gives them to her for free, explaining to her that she made it possible for Al and Steve to have sex with their wives.
  
In 1989, Brandt appeared as the elevator operator in the beginning of the video for the Aerosmith song "Love in an Elevator".

In 2000, she played Glamorous Gyno-American in the Troma Entertainment film Citizen Toxie: The Toxic Avenger IV.

Filmography
 1987 Can't Buy Me Love (film) as Girl Named Penny In Ferrari 
 1987 The Joe Piscopo Halloween Party as Dancer
 1988 Beach Boys "Kokomo (song)" Music Video as Beach Girl
 1989 Married... with Children as herself (1 episode entitled "Desperately Seeking Miss October")
 1989 Aerosmith "Love in an Elevator" Music Video as Elevator Operator
 1990 Wedding Band (film) (1990) as Serena
 1991 Mötley Crüe "Anarchy In The USA" as Stage Guest (with son, Gunner)
 2000 Citizen Toxie: The Toxic Avenger IV as Glamorous Gyno-American
 2001 Ticker as Cocktail Waitress

Personal life
From May 1990 to November 1996, Brandt was married to Nikki Sixx, the bassist of heavy metal band Mötley Crüe. They have three children: Gunner Nicholas Sixx (born January 25, 1991), Storm Brieann Sixx (born April 14, 1994), and Decker Nilsson Sixx (born May 23, 1995).

Brandt was involved with a cocaine-trafficking syndicate importing cocaine into Australia between July and December 2007.  On November 15, 2013, Brandt was extradited from Los Angeles, California, to Sydney, Australia, to face criminal charges in a Sydney court. In April 2014, Brandt pleaded guilty to a charge of conspiring to import drugs. On August 29, 2014, Brandt was sentenced to up to six years but was eligible for parole in November 2016. As of 2019, Brandt lives in southern California.

See also
 List of Playboy Playmates of 1987
 List of people in Playboy 1980–1989

References

External links
 
 
 

1980s Playboy Playmates
1968 births
Living people
20th-century American actresses
American drug traffickers
People from Santa Clara, California
21st-century American women